Mitchell Wand is a computer science professor at Northeastern University. He received his Ph.D. from Massachusetts Institute of Technology. His research has centred on programming languages and he is a member of the Northeastern Programming Research Lab. He is also the co-author, with Daniel P. Friedman and Christopher T. Haynes, of Essentials of Programming Languages.

References

External links
 Northeastern University Programming Research Lab Homepage
 Mitchell Wand's Homepage at Northeastern University
 

American computer scientists
Programming language researchers
Living people
Year of birth missing (living people)